The 2009 Formula V6 Asia season was the fourth And final season Formula V6 Asia championship. The season started on the weekend of May 29–31 at Sepang, but the series was eventually cancelled after four races, making Hamad Al Fardan, who won all four races, the season champion.

Drivers and teams

Race calendar

Full Series Results
Points are awarded in both races as following: 15, 12, 10, 8, 6, 5, 4, 3, 2 for 9th and 1 bonus points for pole position in the first of the two venue races but only awarded to drivers, not for teams. Only the drivers that achieve races are awarded by points. The team standing is obtained with the best two drivers of each team at each race

Drivers

Teams

References

External links
 Formula Asia V6 by Renault official website

Formula V6 Asia season 2009
Formula V6 Asia seasons
2009 in Asian sport
V6 Asia